Pierre de Maupeou d'Ableiges (7 June 1910 – 24 December 1996) was a French equestrian. He competed in two events at the 1948 Summer Olympics.

References

1910 births
1996 deaths
French male equestrians
Olympic equestrians of France
Equestrians at the 1948 Summer Olympics
People from Gray, Haute-Saône
Sportspeople from Haute-Saône